Wang Jin is the name of:

Wang Jin (Tang dynasty) (700–781), Tang dynasty chief councilor
John Baptist Wang Jin (1924–2014), Chinese Roman Catholic bishop
Wang Jin (archaeologist) (1926–2020), Chinese archaeologist
Jing Wang (professor) (1950–2021), also known as Wang Jin, Taiwan-born professor of Chinese Language & Culture at Massachusetts Institute of Technology, US
Wang Jin (film producer) (born 1980), Chinese film producer

Sportspeople
Wang Jin (archer) (born 1960), Chinese archer
Wang Jin (judoka) (born 1972), Chinese judoka
Wang Jin (skier) (born 1997), Chinese freestyle skier

See also
Wangjin, a traditional East Asian headgear
Wang Jing (disambiguation)
Jin Wang (disambiguation)